Scott Garlick (born May 29, 1972 in Phoenix, Arizona) is an American retired soccer goalkeeper who played 10 seasons in Major League Soccer from 1997 to 2006.

Garlick went on trial to Waterford United in 1994. Initially for a month he stayed for two seasons before returning home in the hope of signing for a MLS club.

Garlick was not initially drafted by an MLS team; instead, he signed with the Greensboro Dynamo of the USISL. D.C. United called him up early in the 1997 MLS season, and then signed him for good later in the year. Garlick promptly backstopped DC to the MLS Cup, but the emergence of Tom Presthus led United to trade Garlick to the Tampa Bay Mutiny prior to the 1999 season.

Garlick spent two and a half seasons in Tampa, until he was traded to the Colorado Rapids in a deal that saw him packaged with Carlos Valderrama. He left Tampa as the team's all-time leader in most goalkeeping categories. He recorded 184 saves in the year 2000, an MLS single-season record that still stands today.
 
Garlick spent two and a half seasons with the Rapids as well, but the arrival of Joe Cannon and Scott's subsequent controversial benching for the 2003 playoffs opened the door for his departure. He was traded to the Dallas Burn prior to the 2004 season. Although Garlick began the season as the starter, he lost his job to Jeff Cassar down the stretch. He was traded to Real Salt Lake at the conclusion of the 2005 season.

Garlick is a graduate of Brophy College Preparatory in Phoenix.

In late February 2007 Garlick retired from soccer. In March 2007, he joined Cushman and Wakefield as a Senior Director of tenant representation.

References

1972 births
Living people
American expatriate soccer players
Soccer players from Phoenix, Arizona
Waterford F.C. players
League of Ireland players
USISL players
North Carolina Fusion U23 players
D.C. United players
Tampa Bay Mutiny players
Colorado Rapids players
FC Dallas players
Real Salt Lake players
USL First Division players
Major League Soccer players
Major League Soccer All-Stars
American soccer players
Association football goalkeepers
San Diego Toreros men's soccer players